The 2013 Mini Challenge season was the twelfth season of the Mini Challenge UK. The season started on 6 April at Snetterton Motor Racing Circuit and ended on 29 September at Donington Park. The season featured six rounds across the UK and one in Holland.

Calendar

Entry list

Championship standings
Scoring system
Championship points were awarded for the first 15 positions in each Championship Race. Entries were required to complete 75% of the winning car's race distance in order to be classified and earn points. There were bonus points awarded for Pole Position and Fastest Lap.

Championship Race points

Drivers' Championship

JCW Class

Cooper Class

References

Mini Challenge UK